The 1988–89 SK Rapid Wien season was the 91st season in club history.

Squad

Squad and statistics

Squad statistics

Fixtures and results

League

Cup

Supercup

European Cup

References

1988-89 Rapid Wien Season
Rapid